Khodor Munir Alaywan (خضر منير عليوان, born ) is a Lebanese male weightlifter, competing in the 77 kg category and representing Lebanon at international competitions. He participated at the 1988 Summer Olympics in the 52 kg event and twelve years later at the 2000 Summer Olympics in the 85 kg event. He competed at world championships, most recently at the 1999 World Weightlifting Championships.

Major results

References

External links
 
 

1973 births
Living people
Lebanese male weightlifters
Weightlifters at the 1988 Summer Olympics
Weightlifters at the 1998 Asian Games
Weightlifters at the 2000 Summer Olympics
Olympic weightlifters of Lebanon
Place of birth missing (living people)
Asian Games competitors for Lebanon